The Confederate Navy was the navy of the Peru-Bolivian Confederation.

History
After the victory of the alliance the armies of Luis José de Orbegoso, then constitutional president of Peru, and Andrés de Santa Cruz, then president of Bolivia, against those of Felipe Santiago Salaverry during the civil war, assemblies were soon established to make way for the creation of the Confederation, including its armed forces.

The navy was responsible for the capture of the Juan Fernández Islands on November 14. 1837. It was also serviced by privateers hired by the government.

See also
Confederate Army (Peru–Bolivian Confederation)

References

Bibliography
 

Peru–Bolivian Confederation
Military of Bolivia
Military history of Bolivia
Military of Peru
Military history of Peru
Disbanded armed forces